Monkey Park may refer to a number of different reserves or parks hosting monkeys:

 Ubud Monkey Forest, Bali
 Jigokudani Monkey Park, Yamanouchi, Nagano Prefecture, Japan
 Iwatayama Monkey Park, Kyoto, Japan. 
 , located on the Monkey Park Monorail Line, in Inuyama, Aichi Pref., Japan
 Bijilo Forest Park, The Gambia

See also
 MonkeyParking, a mobile app for parking in San Francisco
 :Category:Monkey parks